Kamory Doumbia (born 18 February 2003) is a Malian professional footballer who plays as an midfielder for Ligue 1 club Reims and the Mali national team.

Club career
Doumbia is a product of the academy of the Malian club Guidars. On 9 July 2021, he signed with the reserves of Reims. He made his professional debut with the senior Reims team in a 0–0 Ligue 1 tie with Clermont Foot on 9 January 2022.

International career
Doumbia was called up to the Mali national team for matches in June 2022. He debuted with Mali in a 1–0 friendly win over Zambia on 23 September 2022.

References

External links
 
 

2003 births
Living people
Sportspeople from Bamako
Malian footballers
Mali international footballers
Association football midfielders
Ligue 1 players
Championnat National 2 players
Stade de Reims players
Malian expatriate footballers
Malian expatriate sportspeople in France
Expatriate footballers in France